Richmond Hursthouse (5 May 1845 – 11 November 1902) was a 19th-century Member of Parliament in Nelson, New Zealand, and a cabinet minister.

Family life
Hursthouse was born in New Plymouth in 1845, soon after his family's emigration from England. His parents were John Hursthouse (1811–1860) and Helen, née Wilson (1803–1895). His parents and other family members (his father's brother, Charles Hursthouse, and a cousin, Thomas Newsham, and their families) came to New Zealand on the Thomas Sparks; they arrived in Wellington in early 1843. John Hursthouse and family proceeded to New Plymouth, but the outbreak of the First Taranaki War saw the family move to Nelson. Richmond Hursthouse's education was restricted to one year at Nelson's Bishop's School.

In 1873, he married Mary Fearon, the daughter of Edward Fearon. She died in September 1901.

Activities
Aged 19, he helped with the survey of Westport. Afterwards, he returned to New Plymouth and was in the militia. He participated in various gold rushes, including Thames, Gulgong in New South Wales, and Coromandel.

Political career

Hursthouse represented the Motueka electorate from 1876 to 1887. In 1884, he held the portfolio of Minister for Lands and Immigration during the brief fourth Atkinson Ministry.

For many years, he was a member of the Nelson Land Board and of the Nelson Education Board.

He stood for Waimea-Picton in 1890, Motueka in 1896, and for the City of Nelson electorate in 1893 and 1899, and came second each time.

When Motueka became a borough council in 1899, he was the town's first mayor.

Hursthouse died in New Plymouth on 11 November 1902, after falling ill with pneumonia while campaigning for the Egmont electorate. He was buried at Te Henui Cemetery.

Notes

References

 

1845 births
1902 deaths
Members of the New Zealand House of Representatives
Members of the Cabinet of New Zealand
New Zealand MPs for South Island electorates
Mayors of Motueka
Unsuccessful candidates in the 1887 New Zealand general election
Unsuccessful candidates in the 1890 New Zealand general election
Unsuccessful candidates in the 1896 New Zealand general election
Unsuccessful candidates in the 1893 New Zealand general election
Unsuccessful candidates in the 1899 New Zealand general election
Burials at Te Henui Cemetery
People from New Plymouth
Atkinson–Hursthouse–Richmond family
19th-century New Zealand politicians